The palatovaginal canal (also pharyngeal canal) is a canal between the sphenoid bone and the palatine bone that connects the nasopharynx with the pterygopalatine fossa. It transmits the pharyngeal branch of the third part of the maxillary artery (not to be confused with the ascending pharyngeal artery, a branch of external carotid). An inconstant vomerovaginal canal may lie between the ala of the vomer and the vaginal process of the sphenoid bone, medial to the palatovaginal canal, and lead into the anterior end of the palatovaginal canal.

Contents
The palatovaginal canal contains the pharyngeal nerve from the pterygopalatine ganglion and the pharyngeal branch of the maxillary artery. The pharyngeal nerve conveys sensory information from the mucosa of the nasopharyngeal posterior wall to the maxillary nerve passing through the pterygopalatine ganglion (without any synapse). The pharyngeal branch of the maxillary artery supplies part of the roof of the nasal fossae, nasopharynx, sphenoid sinuses and Eustachian tube.

Structure
The opening to the palatovaginal canal in the nasal cavity is located near the lateral margin of the ala of the vomer, at the roots of the pterygoid process.
The other opening to the palatovaginal canal is located inferiorly and posteriorly in the pterygopalatine fossa.

References

External links
 

Musculoskeletal system